Puteri (lit. Princess) is a short animated series created by Malaysian animation company Les' Copaque Production. This animation formerly aired on TV3 from November 20, 2014, to November 25, 2014 at 9pm.

Synopsis
Puteri tells the story of five sibling Princesses from Kingdom of Limau. Puteri Limau Manis, the eldest and heir to the throne, is the beauty of the family, and able to captivate anyone and soothe anger with her sweet voice. Next to her in age is Puteri Limau Kasturi, the warrior at heart and a self-proclaimed tomboy who loves the outdoors and swordplay. Puteri Limau Purut is shy, timid, and loves a quiet time in her garden, but makes up for her bashfulness by being the most brilliant of her sisters, thanks to her love for books. Puteri Limau Bali is the polar opposite of Purut, full of energy with her sparkling, infectious personality and her love for food and cooking. The youngest and the baby of the family is Puteri Limau Nipis, who is adorable and loves to play with her pet cat Jebat around the palace compound.

In every episode of the series, antagonists of men and magical creatures come to corrupt the kingdom. The princesses will band together and make use of their abilities to save their kingdom.

Characters

Princess Limau Manis
She is 18 and is the eldest of 5 siblings. She will be the heir to the Throne Kingdom. She looks pretty and often gives sweet words. When invited to the war, She is the most enthusiastic and optimistic of all. She was also forced to marry because of the inheritance. She has the power to move around using her own scarf. In bizarre showings, animals are often shown to like the Puteri Limau Manis.

Princess Limau Kasturi
She is the second daughter of the King and aged 17. Kasturi is coarse and has heroic qualities. Kasturi dislikes "princess ethics" and prefers to spend time practicing fighting. She has a powerful magic dagger.

Princess Limau Purut
She is the third daughter of the King and aged 15. She has a magical hairpin that can cure any living thing, including plants. She is shy and pretty. She always let her hair cover a small part of her scarred face.

Princess Limau Bali
She is the fourth daughter of the King and aged 14. She has a fat body compared to her siblings. Therefore, she is quite sensitive to the topic of weight. She is a good cook, although her food does not seem exotic but it tastes good. She has a magical fan that can change the size and function.

Princess Limau Nipis
She is 10 and is the youngest of 5 siblings. Her looks are so spoiled and naive. However, Nipis is actually a great investigator and knows all the intricacies of the palace. She is often accompanied by her pet cat called Jebat. She has a laid-back character and is stubborn. Nipis has a magical whip that is often used as a game.

Music
The theme song for Puteri  was sung by Adreena.

Reception
Puteri received an award in ASEAN Character Award - Grand Prize in 2015 by Asean Japan Center.

References

2010s animated television series
Malaysian children's animated fantasy television series
Anime-influenced Western animated television series